George William Marshall, LL.D., FSA (1839–1905) was an English officer of arms, serving as Rouge Dragon Pursuivant from 1887 to 1904, and as York Herald from 1904 to 1905.

He served as High Sheriff of Herefordshire for 1902, and was the same year appointed a deputy lieutenant of Herefordshire.

He published Collections for a Genealogical Account of the Family of Comberbach in 1866. This was the first Comberbach surname study.

He compiled The Genealogist's Guide (first edition 1879; revised and extended editions 1885, 1893 and 1903), a directory of published genealogies, which remains a standard work of reference.

Works

References

External links
The College of Arms
CUHAGS Officer of Arms Index

Deputy Lieutenants of Herefordshire
English officers of arms
High Sheriffs of Herefordshire
1839 births
1905 deaths